Diretas Já (Direct (Elections) Now) was a civil unrest movement which, in 1984, demanded direct presidential elections in Brazil.

Participants of the movement
The movement brought together diverse elements of Brazilian society. Participants came from a broad spectrum of political parties, trade unions, civil, student and journalistic leaderships. Politicians involved included Ulysses Guimarães, Tancredo Neves, André Franco Montoro, Fernando Henrique Cardoso, Mário Covas, Teotônio Vilela, Dante de Oliveira, José Serra, Luiz Inácio Lula da Silva, Eduardo Suplicy and Leonel Brizola among others. Besides politicians, the movement also included artists such as Milton Nascimento, Fernanda Montenegro, Gilberto Gil, Bruna Lombardi, Fafá de Belém, and Chico Buarque de Holanda. Journalists such as Henfil, Osmar Santos and Eliel Ramos Maurício covered the assemblies for periodicals Diário de Sorocaba and Folha de Itapetininga. Football team Corinthians, already well-known for activism with their Corinthians Democracy movement, printed "Diretas Já" on the back of their jerseys. Sectors of the Roman Catholic Church, as well as other religions, also supported the movement.

Location of the first public protest
The first public protest for the Diretas occurred in the emancipated town of Abreu e Lima, in Pernambuco, on March 31, 1983. Periodicals of the state of Pernambuco, at the time, organized members of the PMDB party in the city, which were followed by protests in the capital of the state of Goiás, Goiânia, on June 15, 1983, as well as the Charles Miller Plaza, in front of Pacaembu Stadium, on November 27, 1983 in São Paulo.

Economic situation
The growth of the movement coincided with the aggravation of an economic crisis (with an annual inflation of 239% in 1983). This led to the mobilization of class entities and unions. The movement linked representatives from diverse political backgrounds under the common cause of direct elections for president. Many pro-status quo politicians, sensitive to their base, had also formed a block of disagreement within "ARENA", the pro-government party, when PDS was founded.

In the following year, the movement gained critical mass and was able to mobilize itself openly. On the anniversary of the city of São Paulo (January 25), the first great assembly of the campaign for direct elections for president was made possible by André Franco Montoro, then-governor of São Paulo, on Praça da Sé, a major public square adjacent to the São Paulo Cathedral (Catedral da Sé).

By this time the Military Regime had lost a great deal of prestige with the majority of the population. Low ranking members of the military, with their wages diminished due to inflation, started to voice their discontent to their superiors.

On April 16, shortly before the vote in Congress which would enable direct elections for president, a final demonstration took place in São Paulo. Afraid that the Praça da Sé would prove too small, the Anhangabaú Valley was chosen, where an estimated crowd of over 1.5 million people attended, in what was the largest political demonstration ever seen in Brazil.

During the month of April 1984, then-president Figueiredo increased the censorship on the press and promoted arrests and police violence. Nonetheless, the Diretas Já amendment (known as Dante de Oliveira law, after its author) was voted on April 25, 1984. Despite a vote of 298 in favor, with 65 against, 112 pro-government deputies abstained, leaving the Chamber without a quorum. As a result, the bill died.

Despite the bill's failure, the movement proved to be a catalyst for various opposition forces and a voice for popular discontent. The re-democratization process ended with the return of civil power in 1985 and the approval of a new constitution in 1988, which called for the first direct presidential elections in 1989. Brazil then elected Fernando Collor de Mello, its first democratically elected president since 1961.

Assemblies 
This is a partial list in chronological order of the Diretas Já demonstrations:

See also
 1964 Brazilian coup d'état
 History of Brazil (1964-1985)

References

External links 
 Folha de S.Paulo Assembly of "Diretas-Já"
 "Diretas-Já" O Estado de S. Paulo
 "Diretas-Já" Abril Cultural

Political history of Brazil
1984 in Brazil
1984 protests